Pinninti Tapaswi (born 13 August 1996) is an Indian cricketer. He made his List A debut on 25 September 2019, for Andhra in the 2019–20 Vijay Hazare Trophy. He made his Twenty20 debut on 5 November 2021, for Andhra in the 2021–22 Syed Mushtaq Ali Trophy. He made his first-class debut on 17 February 2022, for Andhra Pradesh in the 2021–22 Ranji Trophy.

References

External links
 

1996 births
Living people
Indian cricketers
Andhra cricketers
Place of birth missing (living people)